OCD is an abbreviation that may stand for:

Medical uses
 Obsessive–compulsive disorder (OCD), a mental disorder
 Obsessive–compulsive personality disorder (OCPD), a mental disorder that is often mistakenly called OCD
 On-call duty, a long shift that may be assigned to medical residents
 Ortho-Clinical Diagnostics, an American company
 Osteochondritis dissecans, a painful joint condition in humans and animals

Computing
 OCD, the file suffix used by OCAD mapping software
 Object collision detection
 On-chip debugging

Offices and institutions
 Office of Civil Defense, the National Emergency Management Agency of the Philippines
 Office of Civilian Defense, a World War II-era U.S. government agency   
 Office of Community Development, a part of the U.S. Department of Agriculture's rural development activities   
 Office of Cultural Development, a part of the Louisiana Department of Culture, Recreation & Tourism
 OCD or O.C.D., the post-nominal initials for members of the Catholic order of Discalced Carmelites (from the Latin, Ordo Carmelitarum Discalceatorum)

Other
 "O.C.D.", a song by Suicide Silence from their third album The Black Crown
 Obsessive Completion Distinction, an achievement demanding extraordinary attention to detail in the video game World of Goo
 Octavian County Day School, a school attended by characters of Lisi Harrison's The Clique books
 OCD overdrive pedal by Fulltone
 "OCD", a song by Logic featuring Dwn2Earth
 A 1999 cassette album by the noise musician Prurient
 Offshore Development Center
 Okanogan Conservation District
 Oxford Classical Dictionary